Chaudhary Devi Lal (born Devi Dayal; 25 September 1915 – 6 April 2001) was an Indian statesman and politician who served as 6th Deputy Prime Minister of India from 1989 to 1990 and from 1990 to 1991.  Lal emerged as farmer leader from the state of Haryana, and served as the Chief Minister of Haryana from 1977 to 1979 and then from 1987 to 1989.He was the founder of Indian National Lok Dal. He was popularly known as Tau, meaning uncle.

Personal life
Chaudhary Devi Lal was born on 25 September 1915 in Teja Khera village of Sirsa district in present-day Haryana. His mother's name was Shugna Devi and father's name was Lekh Ram Sihag. Lekh Ram was a Jat of Chautala village and he owned 2750 bighas of land. He received education up to middle-school. His son Om Prakash Chautala has also served as Haryana's chief minister four times.

Lal's ancestral roots lie in Bikaner, Rajasthan, from where his great-grandfather Tejaram had migrated. His father Lekhram relocated to Chautala village in 1919 when Lal was five years old. In 1928 at the age of 16 Lal participated in demonstration by Lala Lajpat Rai. He was a student of "Dev Samaj Public High School Moga" in Moga during his 10th class, at that time was arrested at Congress office in 1930, he quit studies and joined freedom movement. He also took wrestling lesson at an Akhara in Badal village of Punjab. He was first elected MLA in 1952.

Lal comes from a prolific political dynasty of Haryana. His elder brother Sahib Ram Sihag was the first politician from the family who became Congress MLA from Hisar in 1938 and 1947. Lal had four sons, Partap Singh, Om Prakash Chautala, Ranjit Singh and Jagdish Chander. All joined politics except Jagdish who died at a young age. His eldest son, Partap Singh, was an MLA from Indian National Lok Dal in the 1960s.

Independence movement

Lal was a follower of Mahatma Gandhi and was involved in the struggle for India's independence from the British Raj. Both he and his elder brother, Sahib Ram, left their studies unfinished to take part in the freedom movement.

For this, he was sentenced to one year rigorous imprisonment and sent to Hissar jail on 8 October 1930. He took part in the movement of 1932 and was kept in Sadar Delhi Thana. In 1938 he was selected delegate of All-India Congress Committee. In March 1938 his elder brother was elected a Member of the Legislative Assembly in a by-election on the Congress party ticket. In January 1940, Sahib Ram courted arrest as a satyagrahi in the presence of Lal and over ten thousand people. He was fined Rs 100 and sentenced to 9 months imprisonment.

Lal was arrested on 5 October 1942 and kept in jail for two years for taking part in the 1942 Quit India movement. He was released from prison in October 1943 and he negotiated parole for his elder brother. In August 1944, Chhotu Ram, the then Revenue Minister, visited Chautala village. He, along with Lajpat Rai Alakhpura, made efforts to woo both Sahib Ram and Lal to desert Congress and join the Unionist Party. But both workers, being dedicated freedom fighters, refused to leave the Congress Party.

Post independence

Pre-1960: Punjab Assembly politics 
After independence, Lal emerged as a popular farmer leader in the 1950s and started a farmers' movement, for which he was arrested along with his 500 workers. After some time, then chief minister, Gopi Chand Bhargava, made an agreement and the Muzzara Act was amended. He was elected a member of the Punjab Assembly in 1952 and President of the Punjab Congress in 1956. In 1958, he was elected from Sirsa.

Pre-1980: Haryana Assembly politics 
He played an active and decisive role in the formation of Haryana as a separate state. In 1971 he left Congress. In 1972 vidhan sabha elections, he contested unsuccessfully against the two Congress heavyweights, Bansi Lal in Tosham constituency and Bhajan Lal in Adampur seat. In 1974 he successfully contested in the Rori constituency. In 1975, Indira Gandhi declared the Emergency and Lal along with all opposition leaders were jailed for 19 months. In 1977, the emergency ended and general elections were held. He was elected on the Janata Party ticket from Bhattu Kalan and became the Chief Minister of Haryana.

Post-1980: national and state politics 
He remained a Member of Parliament from 1980 to 1982 and was a member of State assembly between 1982 and 1987. He formed Lok Dal and started Nyaya Yuddh (en. battle for justice), under the banner of Haryana Sangharsh Samiti, and became hugely popular among masses. In the 1987 state elections, the alliance led by Lal won a record victory winning 85 seats in the 90 member house. Congress won the other five seats. Lal became the chief minister of Haryana for the second time. In the 1989 parliamentary election, he was simultaneously elected, both from Sikar, Rajasthan and Rohtak, Haryana.On December 1, 1989, VP Singh nominated Devi Lal for the post of Prime Minister in the middle house of Parliament, despite Singh himself being nominated as a pure alternative prime ministerial candidate.  But the Jat leader of Haryana refused to accept the post of Prime Minister and magnanimously nominated VP Singh for the post of Prime Minister.  But the refusal to give the prime ministership to Devilal's close friend Chandrasekhar, who was VP Singh's prime ministerial rival within the Janata Dal, caused surprise among many party members.  Because some leaders told him that Devilal will come as the prime ministerial candidate.  He was working honestly in many positions in the Congress and found many allegations of corruption against the government of Rajiv Gandhi.  B.  Declaring Singh as a qualified candidate for Prime Minister, Devi Lal walked out of the assembly and refused to participate in the cabinet. He became deputy prime minister of the country from 1989 to 1991 in the non-Congress governments of VP Singh and Chandra Shekhar He was elected to Rajya Sabha in August 1998. Later, his son Om Prakash Chautala also became the chief minister of Haryana.

Lal died on 6 April 2001 at the age of 85. He was cremated at Sangarsh Sthal on the banks of the river Yamuna in New Delhi. "Kisan Ghat" is the samadhi of another popular leader of the farmers, Charan Singh, the fifth Prime Minister of India.

See also
 First Devi Lal ministry (1977–1979)
 Second Devi Lal ministry (1987–1989)
 Aaya Ram Gaya Ram
 Dynastic politics of Haryana

References

External links

Official website of Indian National Lok Dal

|-

|-

1914 births
2001 deaths
Chief Ministers of Haryana
Indian Deputy Prime Ministers
Indian independence activists from Haryana
People from Sirsa district
V. P. Singh administration
Punjab, India MLAs 1952–1957
Prisoners and detainees of British India
India MPs 1989–1991
Lok Sabha members from Rajasthan
Indians imprisoned during the Emergency (India)
Chief ministers from Janata Party
Chautala family
Samata Party politicians
Indian National Lok Dal politicians
Chief ministers from Janata Dal
Agriculture Ministers of India
Samajwadi Janata Party politicians
Indian National Congress politicians from Haryana
Janata Party politicians
Janata Dal politicians
Bharatiya Lok Dal politicians
Leaders of the Opposition in Punjab, India
Lok Sabha members from Haryana
India MPs 1980–1984